Macrobiotus is a genus of tardigrade consisting of about 100 species.

Species 
The genus includes the following species:

 Macrobiotus acadianus (Meyer & Domingue, 2011)
 Macrobiotus almadai Fontoura, Pilato & Lisi, 2008
 Macrobiotus alvaroi Pilato & Kaczmarek, 2007
 Macrobiotus anderssoni Richters, 1907
 Macrobiotus andinus Maucci, 1988
 Macrobiotus anemone Meyer, Domingue & Hinton, 2014
 Macrobiotus annewintersae Vecchi & Stec, 2021
 Macrobiotus ariekammensis Węglarska, 1965
 Macrobiotus azzunae Ben Marnissi, Cesari, Rebecchi & Bertolani, 2021
 Macrobiotus basiatus Nelson, Adkins Fletcher, Guidetti, Roszkowska, Grobys & Kaczmarek, 2020
 Macrobiotus biserovi Bertolani, Guidi & Rebecchi, 1996
 Macrobiotus caelestis Coughlan, Michalczyk & Stec, 2019
 Macrobiotus caelicola Kathman, 1990
 Macrobiotus canaricus Stec, Krzywański & Michalczyk, 2018
 Macrobiotus caymanensis Meyer, 2011
 Macrobiotus crenulatus Richters, 1904
 Macrobiotus crustulus Stec, Dudziak & Michalczyk, 2020
 Macrobiotus dariae Pilato & Bertolani, 2004
 Macrobiotus deceptor Meyer, Hinton, Gladney & Klumpp, 2017
 Macrobiotus denticulus Dastych, 2002
 Macrobiotus diversus Biserov, 1990
 Macrobiotus drakensbergi Dastych, 1993
 Macrobiotus dulciporus Roszkowska, Gawlak, Draga & Kaczmarek, 2019
 Macrobiotus echinogenitus Richters, 1903
 Macrobiotus engbergi Stec, Tumanov & Kristensen, 2020
 Macrobiotus furcatus Ehrenberg, 1859
 Macrobiotus glebkai Biserov, 1990
 Macrobiotus grandis Richters, 1911
 Macrobiotus halophilus Fontoura, Rubal & Veiga, 2017
 Macrobiotus hannae Nowak & Stec, 2018
 Macrobiotus horningi Kaczmarek & Michalczyk, 2017
 Macrobiotus hufelandi C.A.S. Schultze, 1834
 Macrobiotus humilis Binda & Pilato, 2001
 Macrobiotus hupingensis Yuan et al., 2022
 Macrobiotus hyperboreus Biserov, 1990
 Macrobiotus iharosi Pilato, Binda & Catanzaro, 1991
 Macrobiotus insularis Pilato, 2006
 Macrobiotus joannae Pilato & Binda, 1983
 Macrobiotus julianae (Meyer, 2012)
 Macrobiotus kamilae Coughlan & Stec, 2019
 Macrobiotus kazmierskii Kaczmarek & Michalczyk, 2009
 Macrobiotus kirghizicus Tumanov, 2005
 Macrobiotus kosmali Kayastha et al., 2023
 Macrobiotus kristenseni Guidetti, Peluffo, Rocha, Cesari & Moly de Peluffo, 2013
 Macrobiotus kurasi Dastych, 1981
 Macrobiotus lazzaroi Maucci, 1986
 Macrobiotus lissostomus Durante Pasa & Maucci, 1979
 Macrobiotus longipes Mihelčič, 1971
 Macrobiotus macrocalix Bertolani & Rebecchi, 1993
 Macrobiotus maculatus Iharos, 1973
 Macrobiotus madegassus Maucci, 1993
 Macrobiotus mandalaae Pilato, 1974
 Macrobiotus margoae Stec, Vecchi & Bartels, 2021 in Stec et al. 2021
 Macrobiotus marlenae Kaczmarek & Michalczyk, 2004
 Macrobiotus martini Bartels, Pilato, Lisi & Nelson, 2009
 Macrobiotus modestus Pilato & Lisi, 2009
 Macrobiotus naginae Vecchi et. al, 2022
 Macrobiotus naskreckii Bąkowski, Roszkowska, Gawlak & Kaczmarek, 2016
 Macrobiotus nebrodensis Pilato, Sabella, D'Urso & Lisi, 2017
 Macrobiotus nelsonae Guidetti, 1998
 Macrobiotus noemiae Roszkowska & Kaczmarek, 2019
 Macrobiotus noongaris Coughlan & Stec, 2019
 Macrobiotus norvegicus Mihelčič, 1971
 Macrobiotus occidentalis occidentalis Murray, 1910
 Macrobiotus occidentalis striatus Dastych, 1974
 Macrobiotus ocotensis Pilato, 2006
 Macrobiotus pallarii Maucci, 1954
 Macrobiotus papei Stec, Kristensen & Michalczyk, 2018
 Macrobiotus patagonicus Maucci, 1988
 Macrobiotus paulinae Stec, Smolak, Kaczmarek & Michalczyk, 2015
 Macrobiotus persimilis Binda & Pilato, 1972
 Macrobiotus personatus Biserov, 1990
 Macrobiotus pisacensis Kaczmarek, Cytan, Zawierucha, Diduszko & Michalczyk, 2014
 Macrobiotus polonicus Pilato, Kaczmarek, Michalczyk & Lisi, 2003
 Macrobiotus polyopus Marcus, 1928
 Macrobiotus polypiformis Roszkowska, Ostrowska, Stec, Janko & Kaczmarek, 2017
 Macrobiotus porifini Kuzdrowska, Mioduchowska, Gawlak, Bartylak, A. Kepel, M. Kepel & Kaczmarek, 2021
 Macrobiotus primitivae de Barros, 1942
 Macrobiotus psephus du Bois-Reymond Marcus, 1944
 Macrobiotus pseudofurcatus Pilato, 1972
 Macrobiotus pseudopallarii Stec, Vecchi & Michalczyk, 2021 in Stec et al. 2021
 Macrobiotus punctillus Pilato, Binda & Azzaro, 1990
 Macrobiotus ragonesei Binda, Pilato, Moncada & Napolitano, 2001
 Macrobiotus ramoli Dastych, 2005
 Macrobiotus rawsoni Horning, Schuster & Grigarick, 1978
 Macrobiotus recens Cuénot, 1932
 Macrobiotus ripperi Stec, Vecchi & Michalczyk, 2021 in Stec et al. 2021
 Macrobiotus rybaki Stec & Vecchi, 2021 in Vecchi & Stec 2021
 Macrobiotus sandrae Bertolani & Rebecchi, 1993
 Macrobiotus santoroi Pilato & D'Urso, 1976
 Macrobiotus sapiens Binda & Pilato, 1984
 Macrobiotus scoticus Stec, Morek, Gąsiorek, Blagden & Michalczyk, 2017
 Macrobiotus semmelweisi Pilato, Binda & Lisi, 2006
 Macrobiotus serratus Bertolani, Guidi & Rebecchi, 1996
 Macrobiotus seychellensis Biserov, 1994
 Macrobiotus shonaicus Stec, Arakawa & Michalczyk, 2018
 Macrobiotus sottilei Pilato, Kiosya, Lisi & Sabella, 2012
 Macrobiotus terminalis Bertolani & Rebecchi, 1993
 Macrobiotus trunovae Biserov, Pilato & Lisi, 2011
 Macrobiotus vladimiri Bertolani, Biserov, Rebecchi & Cesari, 2011
 Macrobiotus wandae Kayastha, Berdi, Miaduchowska, Gawlak, Łukasiewicz, Gołdyn & Kaczmarek, 2020
 Macrobiotus wuyishanensis P. Zhang & X.-Z. Sun, 2014
 Macrobiotus yunshanensis Yang, 2002

References

Tardigrade genera
Parachaela